San Vicente is a department of El Salvador in the center of the country. The capital is San Vicente. On October 4, 1834, San Vicente City of Austria and Lorenzana (Ciudad de San Vicente de Austria y Lorenzana) was made the capital of State of El Salvador during the Federal Republic of Central America. In 1840, it was no longer the capital of the State of El Salvador, but it continues to be the capital of the department. The department was created on June 12, 1824. The forest Bosque La Joya is found in San Vincente.

Municipalities
 Apastepeque
 Guadalupe
 San Cayetano Istepeque
 San Esteban Catarina
 San Ildefonso
 San Lorenzo
 San Sebastián
 San Vicente
 Santa Clara
 Santo Domingo
 Tecoluca
 Tepetitán
 Verapaz

History 
During the Salvadoran Civil War, the region was considered a stronghold for the rebel Farabundo Martí National Liberation Front. In August 1982, the Salvadoran Army began a campaign in the area, moving in with ground troops after several days of bombing. On August 21–22, the Atlácatl Battalion surprised a group of hundreds of refugees at El Calabozo beside the Amatitán river, opening fire at close range. More than two hundred are reported to have died, among them infants and elderly, leading the incident to be called El Calabozo massacre.

Volcano of San Vicente

One of the most imposing volcanoes of the coastal chain is the Chinchontepec, or volcano of San Vicente, located in the confines of the department of the same name. Its almost perfect cone, as sugar pile, finishes off in two hill tops and this peculiarity gives origin to its nahuatl name “Hill of two tits”.

The oriental summit was called “volcano of Zacatecoluca”, is the highest one at 2,173 meters over sea level and it presents a well formed and conserved crater whose bottom at 1,990 meters has a swamp in the stormy season.

The western summit, smaller at 2,083 meters, exhibits an open crater to the east.

Dense vegetation covers both summits. To the northeast, at 820 meters in a ravine of 180 meters of longitude, there are fumaroles; fountains of clear and muddy water or small volcanoes of mud. The most important is to the south of the geological fissure. These groups of phenomenon of geological action are called “infiernillos”. In them, the water is at temperatures of 60 °C to 98 °C and they contain great quantities of water vapor, sulfuric acid, sulfuric hydrogen, and carbonic acid.

The Valley of Jiboa expands to the northeast and north of the western summit. It is also called Valley of Millers.

Chichontepec Volcano has also in the midst of the valley, an important archaeological site called "Tehuacan." This was a place of adoration to the Aztec gods, and the found structures demonstrates the type of hierarchical organization their tribes had.

Products
San Vicente is known for the variety of typical sweets made with coconut preserves, nance, and tamarindo. In San Esteban Catarina, sweets of panela and pilon sugar are manufactured. San Sebastian is known for its textile production.

References 

 
Departments of El Salvador
States and territories established in 1824